The 1981 Navy Midshipmen football team represented the United States Naval Academy (USNA) as an independent during the 1981 NCAA Division I-A football season. The team was led by ninth-year head coach George Welsh.

Schedule

Personnel

Games summaries

Syracuse
 Eddie Meyers 298 rush yards, 3 TD

Army

NAVY: Steve Fehr 35 FG
ARMY: Dave Aucoin FG, 4:37

References

Navy
Navy Midshipmen football seasons
Navy Midshipmen football